David C D Calder  (born May 21, 1978) is a Canadian rower. He was born in Victoria, British Columbia. He graduated from Brentwood College School (Mill Bay, British Columbia) in 1996.

He has competed at four Olympics: 2000, 2004, 2008, and 2012.  Competing at the Beijing 2008 Summer Olympics, he won the silver medal in the rowing event Men's coxless pair along with Scott Frandsen. They were the first Canadians to win a medal at the 2008 Olympics, when they won silver, for which Terry Paul was their coach.

He holds the British Columbia 2000 metre ergometer record at the Junior A (Under-19) level with a time of 5:59.9, a time set in 1996 while a student at Brentwood College.

Electoral record

References

External links
  Official website of David Calder
  David Calder on YouTube
 Profile at Rowing Canada

Canadian male rowers
Olympic rowers of Canada
Rowers from Victoria, British Columbia
Rowers at the 2000 Summer Olympics
Rowers at the 2004 Summer Olympics
Rowers at the 2008 Summer Olympics
Rowers at the 2012 Summer Olympics
Olympic silver medalists for Canada
Living people
1978 births
Olympic medalists in rowing
Medalists at the 2008 Summer Olympics
British Columbia Liberal Party candidates in British Columbia provincial elections
Canadian sportsperson-politicians
World Rowing Championships medalists for Canada